Beohari Assembly constituency is one of the 230 Vidhan Sabha (Legislative Assembly) constituencies of Madhya Pradesh state in central India. This constituency came into existence in 1951, as one of the 48 Vidhan Sabha constituencies of the erstwhile Vindhya Pradesh state. It remained double-member until general elections of 1957 after the merge of Vindhya Pradesh into Madhya Pradesh, however it became single-member seat in the general elections of 1962 of Madhya Pradesh.

Overview
Beohari Assembly constituency (constituency number 83) covers the entire Beohari tehsil, Deolond nagar panchayat and part of Jaisinghnagar tehsil of the Shahdol district. This constituency is a part of Sidhi Lok Sabha constituency.

Members of Legislative Assembly

As a constituency of Madhya Bharat

 1951: Ram Kishore Shukla, Socialist Party.

As a constituency of Madhya Pradesh

See also
Beohari

References

Beohari
Shahdol district
Assembly constituencies of Madhya Pradesh